The Queen's Theatre  is a 507-seat mid-scale producing theatre located in Hornchurch in the London Borough of Havering, east London.

History
Hornchurch Urban District Council purchased a derelict cinema on Station Lane (the site of the present Ripon House development) that had been used for storage during the Second World War. They converted this building into a theatre which opened in 1953, the coronation year of Queen Elizabeth II and its name reflects this. The opening production was See How They Run.

The building deteriorated and The London Borough of Havering Council built a new theatre on Billet Lane, designed by Hallam and Brooks. It was opened by Sir Peter Hall in April 1975, with a production of Joseph and the Amazing Technicolour Dreamcoat.

Performances spaces include a 507-seater Main House end-on theatre and a 100+ seater The Other Stage.

The Theatre received a visit from the Queen in 2003, the Theatre's fiftieth anniversary, and in 2013 the Theatre celebrated its Diamond Jubilee.

The Theatre won the UK Theatre Award for Most Welcoming Theatre (East region) in 2016, 2017 and 2018.

In 2018 the Theatre fundraised £1 million for a small scale capital refurbishment creating a new rehearsal room, a learning space, an artist space and a new bar. It also won the Clothworkers' Foundation Theatre Award at the UK Theatre Awards for its innovative Essex on Stage programme.

In 2019 the Theatre, as the lead in a consortium, won an Arts Council England Creative People and Places funding award of £1 million for a four-year programme of arts engagement in Havering.

In 2020 the Theatre won the prestigious London Theatre of the Year Stage Award.

Notable Productions and Artists
Because of the high quality facilities and London location, the Theatre has been able to attract top productions and artists.  The Theatre has been a home to the award-winning productions Blood Brothers, Return to Forbidden Planet, a major revival of Made in Dagenham the Musical, the second iteration of the National Theatre Public Acts programme As You Like It and a homecoming for David Eldridge's In Basildon. Artists who have worked at the theatre include Ian McKellen, Maggie Smith, Martin Shaw, Joan Plowright, Prunella Scales, Nigel Hawthorn, Lucy Benjamin, Richard Eyre, Bernard Cribbins, Conn O’Neill, David Eldridge, Chris Bond, Sadie Hasler, Bob Eaton, Glen Walford, Nichola McAuliffe, Charlie Condou, James Sutton, Tim Firth, Brian Cant and Richard O'Brien. Ian Hendry started his professional acting career at the old Queen's theatre. in Over its 65 plus year history, it has built a track record in creating the best in live entertainment.

The Theatre is currently run by Artistic Director Douglas Rintoul and Executive Director Mathew Russell.  Previous directors include Stuart Burge, Bob Carlton, Anthony Carrick, Ian Clarke, Marina Calderone, Peter Coe, Ian Curteis, Henriette Duckworth, James Gillhouley, Jane Howell, David Phethean, Nancy Poultney, Anthony Richardson, Paul Tomlinson, Bob Tomson and Clifford Williams.

The Queen's Theatre Hornchurch produces over eight shows a year and has a vibrant learning and participatory programme engaging over 11,000 participants annually, enabling people to express themselves and their stories through the arts.

The Theatre works with educational institutions, amateur theatre groups, professional arts groups and wellbeing organisations, but is also connected to the wider theatre ecology in the UK and abroad. Recent partnerships include projects with the National Theatre, the New Wolsey Theatre Ipswich, Derby Theatre, Fiery Angel, Spare Tyre, Leeds Playhouse, Curve Theatre Leicester and The Grand Théâtre de Luxembourg.

Funding
The Queen's Theatre is a registered charity and receives regular funding from the London Borough of Havering and the Arts Council England.

Queen's Green
Adjacent to the theatre is an open space called Queen's Green.

References

External links
Queen's Theatre website

Theatres in the London Borough of Havering
Producing house theatres in London
Producing theatres in England
Hornchurch